São Sebastião Museum is a museum, housed in a 16th-century fortress in the city of São Tomé, São Tomé and Príncipe. It lies in the northeastern part of the city centre, at the southeastern end of Ana Chaves Bay. It contains religious art and colonial-era artifacts. The fortress was built in 1566 by the Portuguese in order to protect the port and city of São Tomé against pirate attacks. A lighthouse was established in the fortress in 1866; it was rebuilt in 1928. The fortress was restored at the end of the 1950s.

See also
Santo António da Ponta da Mina Fortress, located on the island of Príncipe near the island capital Santo António
List of buildings and structures in São Tomé and Príncipe

References

External links

Photo of the part at the Institute of Tropical Scientific Institute (IICT). 

Museums in São Tomé and Príncipe
Buildings and structures in São Tomé
Museums established in 1976
1976 establishments in São Tomé and Príncipe
Portuguese colonial architecture in São Tomé and Príncipe